USS Wacondah (SP-238) was an advanced-design yacht acquired by the U.S. Navy during World War I. She was outfitted as an armed patrol craft assigned to guard the New York City harbor against German submarines and to provide escort protection to commercial ships. Post-war she was sold and continued her maritime career as the yacht Intercolonial.

A turbine-powered steam yacht 

Revolution—a steel-hulled, screw steam yacht designed by Charles L. Seabury—was completed in 1901, at Morris Heights, New York, by the Charles L. Seabury Co. and the Gas Engine and Power Co., for mining engineer F. Augustus Heinze. One of the first American turbine-powered steam "express" yachts, Revolution was later acquired by Boston, Massachusetts, banker Charles Hayden in 1907 and renamed Wacondah.

World War I service 
 
When the United States entered World War I on 6 April 1917, the Navy soon began collecting ships and small craft from civilian owners to serve as auxiliaries and patrol craft. Inspected at the 3d Naval District, Wacondah was acquired by the Navy on 24 May 1917. Fitted out for wartime service, Wacondah was commissioned on 14 September 1917.

Assigned to protect New York harbor 
 
By virtue of her light construction—built for speed rather than sea-keeping -- Wacondah was restricted to "sheltered waters." Assigned to the 3d Naval District, she operated on local patrol duties out of New York harbor for the duration of the war.

Post-war decommissioning 

Decommissioned and struck from the Navy list on 21 August 1919, Wacondah was sold on 4 June 1920 to the International Steamship and Trading Company and renamed Intercolonial.

References 
  
 USS Wacondah (SP-238), 1917-1920. Originally the civilian yacht Revolution (1901), which was later renamed Wacondah and Intercolonial
 NavSource Online: Wacondah (SP 238)

World War I patrol vessels of the United States
Patrol vessels of the United States Navy
Steam yachts
Ships built in Morris Heights, Bronx
1901 ships